Donald S. Siegel is an American economist and academic administrator. He is Foundation Professor of Public Policy and Management and Director of the School of Public Affairs at Arizona State University.

Biography 
Siegel received his B.A. from Columbia College in 1981 and his Ph.D. from Columbia Business School in 1988. He then received a Sloan Research Fellowship at the National Bureau of Economic Research. He then taught at Stony Brook University, was chair of industrial economics at University of Nottingham's business school, and chaired Rensselaer Polytechnic Institute's department of economics before moving to University of California, Riverside, where he was associate dean. 

From 2008 to 2016, Siegel served as dean of the University of Albany's business school, where he concurrently served as professor. He joined the Arizona State University faculty in 2017. In 2022, he was appointed to led ASU's Global Center for Technology Transfer. His scholarship has focused on technology transfer from universities and laboratories to firms, technology and entrepreneurship, as well as corporate governance and social responsibility.

Siegel was elected a fellow of the American Association for the Advancement of Science in 2022. He is also a fellow of the Academy of Management and was elected its dean of fellows in 2020.

Siegel served as the general editor of the Journal of Management Studies.

References 

Living people

Year of birth missing (living people)
Columbia College (New York) alumni
Columbia Business School alumni
Fellows of the American Association for the Advancement of Science
Arizona State University faculty
American university and college faculty deans
Sloan Research Fellows
University at Albany, SUNY faculty
Stony Brook University faculty
University of California, Riverside faculty
Rensselaer Polytechnic Institute faculty
Academics of the University of Nottingham